The cutaneous nerve of arm may refer to:
Superior lateral cutaneous nerve of arm
Posterior cutaneous nerve of arm (Posterior brachial)
Medial cutaneous nerve of arm (Medial brachial)